The Monument of Railwayman (Polish: Pomnik Kolejarza) is a monument by Ryszard Chachulski in city of Szczecin, Poland, located at the Kolumba Street in front of the Szczecin Główny railway station. It was completed in 1964. It depicts a railway worker.

History 
The monument was sculptured by Ryszard Chachulski, and completed on 22 July 1964, as part of the celebration of the 20th anniversary of the PKWN Manifesto by the Polish Committee of National Liberation. The sculpture underwent the restoration in 2011.

Description 
The monument consists of a sculpture of a half-naked railwayman changing a steering. It is made out of artificial stone. It stands on a concrete pedestal. His head is turned towards the entrance of the Szczecin Główny railway station.

Gallery

Bibliography 
 Encyklopedia Szczecina, 2nd volume, University of Szczecin, Szczecin, 2000, 
Szczecin – miasto. Pomniki, rzeźby plenerowe, tablice pamiątkowe. Dokumentacja Miejskiego Konserwatora Zabytków, Szczecin, 1996, record card no. 46.

References 

1964 sculptures
1964 establishments in Poland
Monuments and memorials in Szczecin
Outdoor sculptures in Poland
Sculptures of men
Works about rail transport